James Gillis may refer to:

 James Lisle Gillis (1792–1881), Democratic member of the U.S. House of Representatives from Pennsylvania
 James Louis Gillis (1857–1917), American librarian
 James Gillis (bishop) (1802–1864), Roman Catholic bishop in Scotland
 James Henry Gillis (1831–1910), rear admiral in the United States Navy
 Jim Gillis (golfer), see Maine Open

See also
 James Melville Gilliss (1811–1865), astronomer, United States Navy officer and founder of the United States Naval Observatory
 Jamie Gillis (1943–2010), American pornographic actor